{{automatic taxobox
| image = WhistlingKite.jpg
| image_caption = Whistling kite (Haliastur sphenurus)
| taxon = Haliastur
| authority = Selby, 1840
| subdivision_ranks = Species
| subdivision = 
H. indusH. sphenurus}}Haliastur is a genus of medium-sized diurnal birds of prey. It consists of two species of kites which form part of the subfamily Milvinae;  some authorities place these species in the genus Milvus, despite clear differences in behaviour, voice and plumage.

The genus was erected by the English naturalist Prideaux John Selby in 1840 with brahminy kite (Haliastur indus) as the type species. The name of the genus combines the Ancient Greek hali- "sea-" and the Latin astur'' meaning "hawk".

Description
The two Haliastur species are medium-sized birds of prey with a strong, slightly squat rump, small head, relatively short and wide wings, a medium-long, rounded tail and short but strong legs and toes.

The  Whistling kite reaches a body length of 50 to 60 centimeters and has a wingspan of 120 to 145 centimeters. Males weigh an average of 700 grams, the females are significantly heavier at 850 grams.  The Brahminy kite is a little smaller. Its body length is 44–52 cm, of which 18–22 cm are accounted for by the tail. The span is 110–125 cm. There is no sexual dimorphism in either species, but the females are slightly larger than the males in both species.

The wedge tail has a sand-colored to brown plumage, which is partly dashed. Fledglings have only slightly different plumage than the adult birds. This is different with the Brahminy kite. In adult birds of this species, the head, neck, chest and upper abdomen are white with a more or less distinct, fine, dark longitudinal stripe. The back, upper wing coverts, the upper side of the arm wings, the upper side of the inner wing wing and the basal half of the outer wing wing, the small and middle under wing coverts, the lower abdomen and the leg fletching are dark rust-red. The young birds of this species are all in all almost monochrome, dark blackish gray-brown. The head, neck and the underside of the trunk are spotted and dashed lighter brown. They are thus similar to the adult wedge-tailed harriers and can be confused with one another when observing in the field

Species list
Both of the species found in this genus are large for kites; both are relatively small-headed and have rounded tail tips.

Distribution
The distribution area of the genus extends from the Indian subcontinent to New Caledonia and Tasmania.

The distribution area of the Whistling kite extends from Cenderawasih Bay in western New Guinea to Goodenough Island in the Solomon Sea off the east coast of New Guinea. The range also includes the Solomon Islands east of New Guinea and New Caledonia off the Australian northeast coast. In Australia the wedge-tailed harrier is a very widespread species. It is only absent in parts of the Great Sand Desert. the Nullarbor Desert, the Great Victoria Desert, and the Gibson Desert. The distribution area of the Brahminy kite includes large parts of the Indian subcontinent, Southeast Asia, New Guinea as well as the east and north of Australia.

References

 
Bird genera

Taxa named by Prideaux John Selby